Roseli Amaral Feitosa (15 March 1989, Sao Paulo) is a Brazilian female boxer. At the 2012 Summer Olympics, she competed in the Women's middleweight competition, but was defeated by eventual bronze medalist Li Jinzi in the first round.

Roseli was approximately 5 feet 8 inches (173 cm) tall and weighed 174 lbs (79 kg).

References

Brazilian women boxers
Living people
Olympic boxers of Brazil
Boxers at the 2012 Summer Olympics
Pan American Games medalists in boxing
Pan American Games bronze medalists for Brazil
1989 births
Sportspeople from São Paulo
Boxers at the 2011 Pan American Games
Middleweight boxers
Medalists at the 2011 Pan American Games
AIBA Women's World Boxing Championships medalists
20th-century Brazilian women
21st-century Brazilian women